Congregation Kol Ami is a Reform synagogue in Frederick, Maryland, United States.

History
The congregation was founded on February 21, 2003, by a group of eight families as the Reform Jewish congregation in Frederick. Services are held at Unitarian-Universalist Church on Elmer Derr Road.

In 2004, the congregation received a Torah for use in worship.

In 2005, Kol Ami hired Student Rabbi Daniel Sikowitz. The same year, Kol Ami began its religious school. In November of that year, Kol Ami had been accepted as members in the Union for Reform Judaism.

In 2007, Kol Ami offered and Rabbi Dan Sikowitz accepted the position as first rabbi in Kol Ami's short history.

In October 2007, a group of women at Kol Ami celebrated their bat mitzvahs. The women, who varied in age, were older than the traditional age for such a celebration, but had never had such an opportunity themselves since the tradition was not popular when they were that age.

In 2008, Kol Ami received a Torah saved from the Holocaust from Lviv, Ukraine.  It was the first Torah scroll of the congregation, and they paid $20,000 for it. Members of the congregation, some of whom are of Ukrainian descent, assisted in writing the Torah.

The congregation frequently participates in social action programs such as the Frederick food bank.

The Torah 
Prior to World War II, Lvov was a major center of Jewish life with over 200,000 Jewish inhabitants. The Jews represented the vast array of Jewish practice, from Reform Jews to the Orthodox. When the Nazis invaded Ukraine, they let the Ukrainians round up all the Jews and lock them in their synagogues. They then set fire to them.

A brave priest saved the several Torahs from destruction. It laid in the basement of a monastery for decades. Then, an arts dealer bought the Torahs from the church. He then ripped it apart and sold the parchment for canvas to artists. A rabbi, Menachem Youlus from Save a Torah (an organization that brings forgotten Torahs to welcoming congregations) asked the arts dealer for Torah parchment. The man said you have the weekend to assemble all the Torahs and pay for what you have. In the storeroom there were piles of ripped up Torahs and the rabbi assembled twenty-two of them. One of the Torahs was reassembled and found a home at Kol Ami.

However, an investigation by the Washington Post has cast doubt on the authenticity of this and other Torah scrolls purportedly discovered to have survived the Holocaust and been recovered by Menachem Youlis and the Save a Torah Foundation.

See also
Beth Sholom Congregation, a Conservative synagogue in Frederick.

External links

References

Synagogues in Frederick County, Maryland
Reform synagogues in Maryland
Ukrainian-Jewish culture in Maryland
Buildings and structures in Frederick, Maryland
2003 establishments in Maryland